Raymond Jackson or Ray Jackson may refer to:

Raymond Jackson (songwriter) (1941–1972), American soul music songwriter and record producer
Raymond Alvin Jackson (born 1949), United States federal judge
Raymond Jackson ("JAK") (1927–1997), cartoonist of the London Evening Standard
Raymond Jackson (American football) (born 1973), American football player
Raymond Carl Jackson (1928–2008), American botanist

See also
Ray Jackson (disambiguation)